Pamela Saadé, better known as Shiraz is a Lebanese artist that has released popular hits. She represented Lebanon in Miss Earth.

Career 
In 2015, Shiraz released Kif Badak Aani Tghib that was a great success, and later in 2016 Shiraz continued that success with the release of Gamara and Ayesh Ma3aya.

For two years in a row, Shiraz participated in the International Beirut Marathon since 2015, and sang her most popular hits in front of a crowd that exceeded 100,000 in Downtown Beirut, and Beirut Water Front (Biel). In 2015, Shiraz launched a university tour that covered many top leading educational institutions in Lebanon such as Notre Dame University – Louaize and University of Balamand.

Awards 
Shiraz won the Murex d'Or in 2016 and got awarded with the title of The Star of The Youth Song.
Shiraz won the silver trophy from YouTube for passing 100K Subscribers on YouTube.

Discography 
 Layalik
 Chou Ba'amel Bhal Alb
 Sahart Ayouni
 Layalik Remix
 Amout Wansak
 Kif Badak Aani Tghib
 Gamara
 Ayech Ma3aya
 Sahar Sahar
 Ba'ed Lyawm
 Agmal Wahda
 Bella Ciao Bel Arabi

Personal traits 
Shiraz is known for being a pet lover, and is a big supporter of animal rights.

References

External links 
 Shiraz on Facebook
 Shiraz on Instagram

1983 births
Living people
21st-century Lebanese women singers
Miss Earth 2008 contestants
People from Jounieh
Lebanese Christians